Nannizziopsis draconii is a keratinophilic microfungus in the family Onygenaceae that causes skin infections in reptiles, producing hyaline, thin-walled, small, sessile conidia and colonies with a strong skunk-like odour.

References

Further reading

Paré, Jean A., and Lynne Sigler. "An overview of reptile fungal pathogens in the genera Nannizziopsis, Paranannizziopsis, and Ophidiomyces." Journal of Herpetological Medicine and Surgery (2016).

External links

Onygenales
Fungi described in 2013